Taubes is a surname. Notable people with the surname include:

 Clifford Taubes (born 1954), professor of mathematics at Harvard
 Taubes's Gromov invariant, mathematical concept named after Clifford Taubes
 Jacob Taubes (1923-1987), religion sociologist, philosopher and studied Judaism
 Gary Taubes, science journalist and author of Good Calories, Bad Calories
 Susan Taubes (1928-1969), writer and religion sociologist, wife of Jacob Taubes

See also
 Daub (surname)
 Taube (surname)
 Taube family

Patronymic surnames
Jewish surnames